The Milton Historic District is a U.S. historic district (designated as such on November 12, 1987) located in Milton, Florida. The district is along US 90 at the Blackwater River, bounded by Berryhill, Willing, Hill, Canal, Margaret, & Susan Streets. It contains 117 historic buildings.

Fire in 2009
On the night of January 6 a fire occurred in the district and spread along US 90 between Canal Street and Willing Street. It was brought under control, and caused an estimated two million dollars in damage.

References

External links
 Santa Rosa County listings at National Register of Historic Places
 Google Street view

Gallery

National Register of Historic Places in Santa Rosa County, Florida
Historic districts on the National Register of Historic Places in Florida